Samuel Gibson (1790 – 1849) was a British botanist.
 Described as an "artisan botanist", Gibson had little formal education, but was an associate of Henry Baines and assisted Baines with his 1840 work  Flora of Yorkshire.

References

1790 births
1894 deaths
British botanists